Kim So-hee (born December 31, 1999) is a South Korean singer. She is known for being a contestant of K-pop Star 6: The Last Chance, in which she emerged as runner-up as a member of KWINs. She officially debuted as a solo artist on May 21, 2017 and on June 1, 2017, she officially debuted as a member of Alice.

Career

2016: Pre-debut and K-pop Star 6
Kim participated in K-pop Star 6: The Last Chance in 2016 as a trainee promoted by JYP Entertainment. As part of KWINs, which also consisted of Kriesha Tiu and Kim Hye-rim, she emerged as the first runner-up.

2017–present: Solo debut, debut with Alice
On May 19, 2017, Kim made her solo debut with the single "Spotlight". Kim made her debut with Alice on June 1, in which they released their first mini-album, We, First. On December 6, she collaborated with Topp Dogg and JBJ's Kim Sang-gyun (A-Tom) on the duet "Childlike", which was produced by BtoB's Minhyuk.

Discography

Singles

Original soundtracks

Filmography

Dramas

Variety shows

Notes

References

External links

1999 births
Living people
People from Incheon
Musicians from Incheon
K-pop singers
South Korean women pop singers
South Korean contemporary R&B singers
South Korean dance musicians
South Korean female idols
21st-century South Korean singers
21st-century South Korean women singers
K-pop Star participants